Neorhynchocephalus is a genus of tangle-veined flies in the family Nemestrinidae. There are about eight described species in Neorhynchocephalus.

Species
These eight species belong to the genus Neorhynchocephalus:
 Neorhynchocephalus mendozanus (Lichtwardt, 1910)
 Neorhynchocephalus mexicanus Bequaert, 1934
 Neorhynchocephalus sackenii (Williston, 1880)
 Neorhynchocephalus sulphureus (Wiedemann, 1830)
 Neorhynchocephalus tauscheri (Fischer, 1812)
 Neorhynchocephalus vitripennis (Wiedemann, 1830)
 Neorhynchocephalus volaticus (Williston, 1883) (tangle-vein fly)
 † Hirmoneura occultator (Cockerell, 1908)

References

Further reading

 

Nemestrinoidea genera
Articles created by Qbugbot
Nemestrinoidea